Mary McNamara (born 1963) is an American journalist and television critic for the Los Angeles Times. She won the 2015 Pulitzer Prize for Criticism.

Biography
McNamara moved from Baltimore to Westminster in elementary school. She graduated from Westminster Senior High School and attended the University of Missouri School of Journalism. While at Missouri, she reported for the Columbia Missourian. Upon her graduation, McNamara wrote for Ms. Magazine, then worked for Whittle Communications. McNamara joined the Los Angeles Times in 1991 as a features writer and editor. In 2009, she became the Times' television critic.

References

External links
Mary McNamara at the Los Angeles Times

1963 births
Living people
Writers from Baltimore
Los Angeles Times people
Missouri School of Journalism alumni
People from Westminster, Maryland
Pulitzer Prize for Criticism winners